Malkar Mohamed (21 November 1943 to 26 February 1996) born in Colombo, Sri Lanka, was a film producer of the Sri Lankan Tamil film industry and a businessman.

Career 
He was the producer of the great commercial success in Tamil film of Sri Lanka, "Komaligal" (Clowns). 
This was the remake of the popular radio comedy drama, "Komaligalin Kummalam".

Hobbies 
Mohamed was a businessman and used to listen to this radio drama. He was attracted by the storyline and thought to make it as a film.

Productions 
The highlight of the film was the performances of Ramadas, a Brahmin in real life, who played the role of a Muslim, and B. H. Abdul Hameed, a Muslim in real life, who played a Brahmin role. The film was most successful in the Box Office rather than previous Sri Lankan Tamil films.

Sources 
 Thambyayah Thevathas in his descriptive work Ilankai Thamil Cinemavin Kathai
 http://www.noolaham.net/project/04/379/379.htm
 http://www.hindu.com/fline/fl1604/16040780.htm
 Sri Lankan Tamil cinema

1943 births
1996 deaths
Sri Lankan Tamil businesspeople
Sri Lankan Tamil film producers
Sri Lankan Muslims